Anatoly Aleksandrovich Zaytsev (6 February 1940 – 13 February 2022) was a Russian politician.

He died in Saint Petersburg on 13 February 2022, at the age of 82.

References

1940 births
2022 deaths
People from Leningrad Oblast
Communist Party of the Soviet Union members
Government ministers of Russia
Tenth convocation members of the Supreme Soviet of the Soviet Union
Recipients of the Order of the Red Banner of Labour